Hansrüedi Knill (born 21 May 1940) is a Swiss middle-distance runner. He competed in the 1500 metres at the 1964 Summer Olympics and the 1968 Summer Olympics.

References

1940 births
Living people
Athletes (track and field) at the 1964 Summer Olympics
Athletes (track and field) at the 1968 Summer Olympics
Swiss male middle-distance runners
Olympic athletes of Switzerland
Place of birth missing (living people)